White Barrow is a large Neolithic long barrow just below the crest of Copehill Down on Salisbury Plain, just south of the village of Tilshead in Wiltshire, England. It is a scheduled monument, and is owned by the National Trust. It was the first ancient monument to be purchased by the National Trust.

History 
White Barrow is 77.5 m long and approximately 47 m wide (including the surrounding ditch).  It has never been fully excavated, but dating of materials found in and around it suggests that it dates from 3500 to 4000 BC, making it contemporary with other long barrows on Salisbury Plain, as well as the nearby causewayed enclosure called Robin Hood's Ball. The antiquarian Colt Hoare opened the mound in the 1806, and found areas of black earth that he believed to be the remains of a wooden-structured burial chamber.

A geophysical survey by English Heritage in 1997 found evidence of a possible burial chamber or mortuary cairn inside the barrow, and an arc of post pits at its eastern end. A former trackway crossing the site from southwest to northeast was also found.

The barrow was designated as a scheduled monument in 1960.

National Trust purchase 
White Barrow was the first piece of land that the National Trust acquired purely in the interests of archaeological conservation. Prior to that, the Trust had mainly been concerned with open spaces, houses and gardens.

Badger exclusion 
In 1998 a family of seven badgers was evicted from a sett they had dug into the barrow.  A badger exclusion licence was obtained from English Nature, and English Heritage gave scheduled monument consent.  The badgers were lured to a new sett outside of the property, and the barrow was covered in chain link fencing to prevent animals from burrowing into it again.  Finds in the badger spoil from the old sett included struck flints, Neolithic and Bronze Age pottery, and part of a red deer antler.

References 

National Trust properties in Wiltshire
History of Wiltshire
Stone Age sites in England
Scheduled monuments in Wiltshire
Barrows in the United Kingdom
Archaeological sites in Wiltshire